Jean-Pascal Barraque (born 24 April 1991) is a French rugby union player. He plays for Clermont. He is a utility back. His usual position is fly-half, although he can play as a centre or fullback. He competed for France at the 2022 Rugby World Cup Sevens in Cape Town.

References

External links
France profile at FFR
ASM Clermont profile
L'Équipe profile

1991 births
Living people
Biarritz Olympique players
French rugby union players
Rugby union fly-halves
France international rugby union players
Sportspeople from Versailles, Yvelines
ASM Clermont Auvergne players
Union Bordeaux Bègles players
Stade Toulousain players
Stade Rochelais players
France international rugby sevens players